Kızılgöl is a village in the Polateli District, Kilis Province, Turkey. It had a population of 71 in 2022.

In late 19th century, German orientalist Martin Hartmann listed the village as a settlement of 15 houses inhabited by Kurds.

References

Villages in Polateli District
Kurdish settlements in Kilis Province